In enzymology, a pyridoxine 5'-O-beta-D-glucosyltransferase is an enzyme that catalyzes the chemical reaction

UDP-glucose + pyridoxine  UDP + 5'-O-beta-D-glucosylpyridoxine

Thus, the two substrates of this enzyme are UDP-glucose and pyridoxine, whereas its two products are UDP and 5'-O-beta-D-glucosylpyridoxine.

This enzyme belongs to the family of glycosyltransferases, specifically the hexosyltransferases.  The systematic name of this enzyme class is UDP-glucose:pyridoxine 5'-O-beta-D-glucosyltransferase. Other names in common use include UDP-glucose:pyridoxine 5'-O-beta-glucosyltransferase, uridine diphosphoglucose-pyridoxine 5'-beta-glucosyltransferase, and UDP-glucose-pyridoxine glucosyltransferase.

References

 

EC 2.4.1
Enzymes of unknown structure